Timothy Alfred Plodinec (born January 27, 1947) is an American former professional baseball player. He appeared in a single game in Major League Baseball (MLB), as a relief pitcher for the St. Louis Cardinals in 1972.

Biography
Plodinec was a member of the United States national baseball team at the 1967 Pan American Games, where the team won the gold medal. As a pitcher for the Arizona Wildcats, Plodinec was named to the 1968 College Baseball All-America Team in June 1968. That month, he was selected by the St. Louis Cardinals in the 33rd round of the 1968 MLB draft.

Plodinec went on to play professionally from 1968 to 1975, primarily in the Cardinals' farm system, appearing in 259 minor-league games while compiling a 45–40 win–loss record and a 3.39 earned run average (ERA). His one appearance in MLB came on June 2, 1972, against the Los Angeles Dodgers—in one-third of an inning in relief, he faced four batters, allowed three singles, and was charged with one earned run.

Following his baseball career, Plodinec was a business executive for the Long John Silver's restaurant chain. In September 2021, Plodinec was inducted to the Sports Hall of Fame at the University of Arizona. In addition to playing college baseball, he also played college football for Arizona, leading the 1965 Wildcats in receiving.

References

External links

1945 births
Living people
People from Aliquippa, Pennsylvania
Baseball players from Pennsylvania
Arizona Wildcats baseball players
All-American college baseball players
Arizona Wildcats football players
Major League Baseball pitchers
St. Louis Cardinals players
Modesto Reds players
St. Petersburg Cardinals players
Québec Carnavals players
Tulsa Oilers (baseball) players
Arkansas Travelers players
Gulf Coast Cardinals players
Algodoneros de Unión Laguna players
Pan American Games medalists in baseball
Pan American Games gold medalists for the United States
Baseball players at the 1967 Pan American Games
Medalists at the 1967 Pan American Games
American expatriate baseball players in Canada
American expatriate baseball players in Mexico